Tetbert (or Theodebert) (died 888) was the Count of Meaux in 877–888. He was related to the Counts of Vermandois and was a brother of Askericus, Bishop of Paris. He died fighting the Vikings in 888.

Sources
MacLean, Simon. Kingship and Politics in the Late Ninth Century: Charles the Fat and the end of the Carolingian Empire. Cambridge University Press: 2003.

Counts of Meaux
888 deaths
Year of birth unknown